Henry Smith (born 14 October 1901) was an English footballer who played in the Football League for Clapton Orient.

References

1901 births
Year of death missing
English footballers
Association football forwards
English Football League players
Leyton Orient F.C. players